Major-General William Carmichael Russell (1824–1905) was a senior Bengal Artillery officer who served in India.

Biography

Born on 11 August 1824, William Carmichael Russell was educated at Bedford School. He received his first commission in the Bengal Artillery in June 1842.  He served in India during the First Anglo-Sikh War, 1845–1846, and during the Indian Mutiny, 1857.

During the First Anglo-Sikh War he fought at the Battle of Ferozeshah, 1845, and at the Battle of Sobraon, 1846, and was awarded the Sutlej Medal. During the Indian Mutiny he served under Brigadier James Neill at Allahabad, and was credited by Field Marshal Roberts with saving the Allahabad arsenal from falling into the hands of the mutineers. In 1858, he served in Oudh. He was appointed Commissary of Ordnance for the Army and Inspector of Ordnance and Magazines in Bengal.

Major General William Carmichael Russell retired in March 1878 and died in Shirley, Southampton on 10 February 1905.

References

1824 births
1905 deaths
People educated at Bedford School
British East India Company Army officers
British Indian Army generals